Grimes is a city in Polk and Dallas counties in the U.S. state of Iowa. The population was 15,392 at the time of the 2020 Census. Grimes is part of the Des Moines metropolitan area.

History
Grimes incorporated as a city on May 7, 1894. It is named after James W. Grimes, a former U.S. senator and the third governor of Iowa.

Geography
Grimes is located at  (41.682939, -93.784438).

Climate

Demographics

2010 census
As of the census of 2010, there were 8,246 people, 3,115 households, and 2,222 families living in the city. The racial makeup of the city was 95.0% White, 1.1% African American, 0.2% Native American, 1.7% Asian, 0.8% from other races, and 1.3% from two or more races. Hispanic or Latino of any race were 2.5% of the population.

There were 3,115 households, of which 44.1% had children under the age of 18 living with them, 58.7% were married couples living together, 9.2% had a female householder with no husband present, 3.4% had a male householder with no wife present, and 28.7% were non-families. 21.7% of all households were made up of individuals, and 4.5% had someone living alone who was 65 years of age or older. The average household size was 2.65 and the average family size was 3.15.

The median age in the city was 31.1 years. 31.2% of residents were under the age of 18; 6% were between the ages of 18 and 24; 36.7% were from 25 to 44; 20.4% were from 45 to 64; and 5.7% were 65 years of age or older. The gender makeup of the city was 49.3% male and 50.7% female.

2000 census
As of the census of 2000, there were 5,098 people, 1,887 households, and 1,437 families living in the city. The racial makeup of the city was 97.19% White, 0.33% African American, 0.22% Native American, 0.88% Asian, 0.27% from other races, and 1.10% from two or more races. Hispanic or Latino of any race were 1.08% of the population. 2005 population estimate was 6,175 (Des Moines Register, July 12, 2006).

There were 1,887 households, out of which 47.3% had children under the age of 18 living with them, 61.7% were married couples living together, 11.1% had a female householder with no husband present, and 23.8% were non-families. 19.6% of all households were made up of individuals, and 5.0% had someone living alone who was 65 years of age or older. The average household size was 2.70 and the average family size was 3.13.

32.7% are under the age of 18, 7.1% from 18 to 24, 39.2% from 25 to 44, 15.6% from 45 to 64, and 5.5% who were 65 years of age or older. The median age was 31 years. For every 100 females, there were 94.7 males. For every 100 females age 18 and over, there were 88.1 males.

The median income for a household in the city was $56,275, and the median income for a family was $60,847. Males had a median income of $40,118 versus $31,588 for females. The per capita income for the city was $23,712. About 2.4% of families and 3.3% of the population were below the poverty line, including 2.7% of those under age 18 and 7.7% of those age 65 or over.

Economy
Japanese animation distributor and online retailer The Right Stuf International is headquartered in Grimes. The company occupies a  office and distribution center.

Parks and recreation 
Grimes has several parks. The main park is Water Works Park, where the public library is also located. A relatively new sports park is now located at the south end of Grimes. It includes a skate park, soccer fields, and baseball fields. Other parks in Grimes include: The Grimes Sports Complex, The Grimes Community Complex, Autumn Park, Beaverbrooke Park, Shawyer Park, North Pointe ParkG, and Glenstone Park.

Government
Grimes' city council meets the second and fourth Tuesday of the month. The mayor is Scott Mikkelsen.

Education 
Grimes, along with Dallas Center, forms the Dallas Center–Grimes Community School District system which draws students from both Polk and Dallas County. The high school (grades 10 through 12) and Meadows (grades 8 and 9) form a campus located inside Grimes, and a middle school (grades 6 and 7) in Dallas Center. The district also has 4 elementary schools, South Prairie Elementary, North Ridge Elementary, and Heritage Elementary, which are all in Grimes, along with Dallas Center Elementary, which resides is Dallas Center. The school mascots are the Mustangs and the Fillies, and the colors are red and white.

Portions of the community of Grimes are also served by the Johnston Community School District. Primarily, areas within the Johnston district, but within the official Grimes city limits are those areas on the east side of Iowa Highway 141 (a.k.a. S.E. Grimes Boulevard).

Notable people
Brandon Fricke, soccer player
Paige Lowary, retired softball pitcher
Brett Moffitt, NASCAR driver
Inez Scott Ryberg, academic and archeologist
Tony Watson, MLB pitcher

References

External links
 City Website
 Chamber of Commerce

Cities in Iowa
Cities in Polk County, Iowa
Cities in Dallas County, Iowa
Des Moines metropolitan area
Populated places established in 1894
1894 establishments in Iowa